Two ships of the Royal Navy have borne the name HMS Patriot:

  was a 10-gun gun vessel captured from the Dutch in 1808 and sold in 1815.
  was an  launched in 1916.

Royal Navy ship names